Marcelo Henrique França de Siqueira (born 23 May 1994), commonly known as Marcelinho, is a Brazilian professional footballer who plays for Juventus as a forward.

Club career
Born in Suzano, Marcelinho graduated from Portuguesa's youth setup. He made his first-team debut on 11 May 2012, coming on as a late substitute in a 0–2 loss at Bahia, for that year's Copa do Brasil.

On 2 November 2013 Marcelinho made his Série A debut, starting in a 1–2 loss at São Paulo. He scored his first goal as a senior on 17 May 2015, in a 1–2 Série C away loss against Londrina.

On 15 September 2015 Marcelinho was loaned to Figueirense, until the end of the year.

References

External links

1994 births
Living people
Footballers from São Paulo (state)
Brazilian footballers
Association football forwards
Campeonato Brasileiro Série A players
Campeonato Brasileiro Série B players
Campeonato Brasileiro Série C players
Campeonato Brasileiro Série D players
Maltese Premier League players
Associação Portuguesa de Desportos players
Figueirense FC players
Clube de Regatas Brasil players
Guarani FC players
Clube Atlético Juventus players
Nacional Atlético Clube (SP) players
Novoperário Futebol Clube players
Birkirkara F.C. players
Brazilian expatriate footballers
Expatriate footballers in Malta
Brazilian expatriate sportspeople in Malta